Music in the Key of Om is an album by Jack DeJohnette recorded in 2003 and released on the Golden Beams label. The album is electronic ambient music, and a departure from DeJohnette's typical work in the jazz style.

Reception
The Allmusic review by Scott Yanow states, "One waits in vain for something — anything — interesting to occur, but it never does. To be fair, this is meant to be background music for one's deep thoughts. But after listening to this monotonous recital straight through, one will need a different form of "healing" music to recover from the mood that it casts! Even for new-age music, this is incredibly dull".

Track listing 
 "Music in the Key of Om" (Jack DeJohnette) - 60:51
 Recorded at Magic Moments Studio, New York in August 2003

Personnel 
 Jack DeJohnette – synthesizer, percussion

References 

Jack DeJohnette albums
2005 albums